Thanks for Listening may refer to:
 Thanks for Listening (Colt Ford album)
 Thanks for Listening (Chris Thile album)
 Thanks for Listening (film), a 1937 American comedy film